The Huawei U1250 is a mobile phone manufactured by Huawei, sold in Canada exclusively by Wind Mobile and by Virgin Mobile Australia as the Virgin VMX.

History
Wind Mobile added the Huawei U1250 to its range in late 2010 as its cheapest phone. It was sometimes sold at a reduced price, as low as $19. The Huawei U2801 replaced the U1250 as Wind's basic candy bar feature phone.

The Huawei U1250 is also available in some countries outside Canada.

Features
The Huawei U1250 is a simple basic phone with some multimedia features. It has a 3.5mm headphone jack for listening to FM radio or to MP3 audio files. The dedicated music key opens the Music menu, allowing users to select which files or station they would like to listen to.  While there are rewind, fast forward and play/pause icons on the left, right and selection keys, respectively, those buttons can only be used for musical purposes while in the Music menu.

A very basic camera is included for taking pictures and videos. While the pictures can have a size of up to 2 megapixels, the camcorder is limited to a low QCIF resolution of 176x144 pixels. There is no dedicated camera button, but the cameramay be accessed by pressing the fast forward (right) key on the clock screen or by selecting Camera on the main menu. The play (selection) button is used to take pictures, or to start and stop video recording.

This phone also has an answering machine feature allowing a 10-second greeting and 60 second recording. It can be found under the "Call settings" labelled as "Auto answer"

Networks
In Canada, the Huawei U1250 is sold exclusively by Wind Mobile. However, it is compatible with many networks in that country, including GSM and AWS-based HSPA+. After getting the phone unlocked, it may also be used on Rogers Wireless, Chatr, Fido,  and Videotron.

Notes

External links
Huawei

Huawei mobile phones
Mobile phones introduced in 2009